Fârliug is a commune in Caraș-Severin County, western Romania. It is composed of six villages: Dezești (Dezesd), Duleu (Dulló), Fârliug, Remetea-Pogănici (Pogányosremete), Scăiuș (Bojtorjános), and Valea Mare (Pogányosvölgy). 

The commune is situated in the historical region of Banat, in the northern part of the county, on the border with Timiș County. It is crossed by national road .

At the 2011 census, the commune had a population of 1,956 people, of which 88.65% were Romanians, 2.2% Ukrainians, 1.69% Roma, and 1.18% Czechs.

Natives
 Jiří Kormaník (1935–2017), amateur wrestler.
 Ioan Sauca (born 1956), priest of the Romanian Orthodox Church, academic, and acting general secretary of the World Council of Churches.

See also
 Castra of Duleu - Odăi
 Castra of Duleu - Cornet cetate

References

Communes in Caraș-Severin County
Localities in Romanian Banat